Viva Kids Vol. 1  is the thirteenth studio album by Mexican recording artist Thalía and her first album meant for children, released on March 25, 2014, by Sony Music Latin. The album consists of 11 tracks, mostly covers of well known children's songs but also includes an original song that Thalía wrote as the theme for her children's book Chupi: The Binky That Returned Home.

On May 29, 2020, she released a sequel album called Viva Kids Vol. 2.

Background and release
The album's lead single was released on March 24, 2014, with the album being released the next day. Thalía said her biggest inspiration for her to record this album were her kids. Thalía also said that the album is something that was born out of a "mischievous moment" she had. Every song is sung in Castilian with the exception of the song Sugar Rush which is an English language cover of the original song by Japanese girl idol group AKB48.

Promotion
Thalía released music videos for every song in the album in order to promote it with the first two being released as singles. In 2013 she also performed the song Tema De Chupi on the TV show Teleton

Commercial performance
The album peaked at number 1 in Mexico and was nominated for Best Latin Children’s Album at the Latin Grammy Awards of 2014.

Track listing

Charts

Weekly charts

Year-end charts

Accolades 

|-
| style="text-align:center;"|2014
| 15th Latin Grammy Awards
| Best Children's Album
|
|-

References

2014 albums
Thalía albums
Spanish-language albums
Sony Music Latin albums
Children's albums